Vestre Jakobselv is a village in Vadsø Municipality in Troms og Finnmark county, in extreme northeastern Norway.

The village is located on the southern shore of the large mainland Varanger Peninsula at the mouth of the river Jakobselva, which is where the village gets its name.  The river empties into the Varangerfjorden at this village.  Upstream from the village, the Jakobselva river is known to be a superb sport fishing river, with a lot of big salmon.  The river winds its way down from the mountains through a lush birch wood valley all the way to the fjord.

Vestre Jakobselv is home to the Third Division soccer club, IL Polarstjernen.  The Vestre Jakobselv Church is located in the village, serving the western part of the municipality.

The local elementary school, Vestre Jakobselv oppvekstsenter, no longer has (as of Q4 2022) an order that tells the school to close.

References

Villages in Finnmark
Populated places of Arctic Norway
Vadsø